The Monaciello or Munaciello ( is a legendary sprite from the ancient folklore of Naples, Italy. 

Monaciello, which means "little Monk" in Neapolitan, is typically a benevolent man, short and stocky, dressed in a long monk's robe with a broad hood.

Legend 
The legend of Monaciello traces to Naples, where he's thought to live in ruins of abbeys and monasteries that crown the Neopolitan hills. The little monk is custodian of the underground canals and water wells of Naples (the "pozzaro"), with which he is intimately familiar and which give him a surreptitious way to enter the city's piazzas and villas — and where if he isn't paid, he might return to pilfer valuables.  

Though Monaciello is known to cause mischief — pulling clothes off people, stealing quilts from bedrooms, and harassing housewives — he is largely benevolent.  He's known to appear at night to those in desperate need, take them to a hidden treasure, and give them his valuables — possibly the aforementioned pilfered valuables — asking for nothing in return. 

An expression refers to those who've received sudden fortune: "Forse avrà il Monaciello in casa" (perhaps he has had the little Monk in his house).  It is thought one might beseech the apparition with food, hoping it will converted to treasure, but not boasting if treasures do appear, lest they vanish as quickly as they came.

Possible explanation 
The habits of Monaciello resemble those of the water carriers of ancient Naples who worked in the numerous tunnels connecting the city's underground wells.  The water carriers had to be short to pass through the tunnels, which gave them access to most houses, villas and Palazzos — wearing overalls that happen to resemble a monk's garments.

In popular culture
 In the book The King of Mulberry Street by Donna Jo Napoli, the character Dom (Beniamino), as well as his mother and grandmother, mention the Monaciello, saying he is a kind trickster and protector of children.
 In the 2021 film The Hand of God, the Little Monk appears as a young boy as opposed to a short, older man. Within the film he grants characters treasure and a moment of levity through his interaction.

Bibliography

External links 
 The legend of the "Monaciello" in Napoli Sotterranea (Naples Underground).

Culture in Naples
Fairies
Italian legendary creatures
Sprites (folklore)